Hannibal is a city along the Mississippi River in Marion and Ralls counties in the U.S. state of Missouri. According to the 2020 U.S. Census, the population was 17,312, making it the largest city in Marion County. The bulk of the city is in Marion County, with a tiny sliver in the south extending into Ralls County.

Developed for river traffic, today the city is tied to vehicle traffic, intersected by Interstate 72 and U.S. Routes 24, 36, and 61. It is across the river from East Hannibal, Illinois.

Hannibal is not the county seat, but it has one of two county courthouses. There is also one in Palmyra, the county seat, which is located more centrally in the county. Hannibal is the principal city of the Hannibal, Missouri micropolitan area, which consists of both Marion and Ralls counties.

History and landmarks

The site of Hannibal was originally inhabited by various cultures of indigenous Native American tribes.

The river community is best known as the mid-19th-century boyhood home of author Samuel Langhorne Clemens (aka Mark Twain, 1835-1910). Twain drew from his childhood settings for his novels The Adventures of Tom Sawyer (1876) and Adventures of Huckleberry Finn (1884). Numerous historical sites are associated with Mark Twain and the places depicted in his fiction.

Heritage tourism contributes to the Hannibal economy, as the city attracts both American and international tourists. The Mark Twain Boyhood Home & Museum marked its 100th anniversary in 2012; it has had visitors from all 50 states and some 60 countries. Most Hannibal residents enjoy the visitors, and the town at large benefits from tourism revenue.

Background
After the United States acquired the Louisiana Territory west of the Mississippi in 1803, European-American settlers began to enter the area. Its early European settlements were established by ethnic French colonists, some from Illinois, who largely spoke French and were Roman Catholic in religion. 

Hannibal was laid out in 1819 by Moses Bates and named after Hannibal Creek (now known as Bear Creek). The name is derived from Hannibal, a hero of ancient Carthage (now in Tunisia). 

The city grew slowly, with a population of 30 by 1830. But by 1846, Hannibal was Missouri's third-largest city when the Hannibal and St. Joseph Railroad was organized by John M. Clemens (Mark Twain's father) and associates. This railway was built to connect to St. Joseph, Missouri in the west, then the state's second-largest city. This railroad was the westernmost line before the Transcontinental Railroad was constructed. It transported mail for delivery to the first outpost of the Pony Express.

Construction of railroads to the area and increased steamboats on the Mississippi River had stimulated growth. In 1843 the city had also annexed the town of South Hannibal. Hannibal gained "city" status by 1845. By 1850 it had 2,020 residents.

In the late 19th and early 20th centuries, the city has served as a regional marketing center for livestock and grain, as well as other products produced locally, such as cement and shoes. Cement for the Empire State Building (completed 1931) and Panama Canal was manufactured at the Atlas Portland Cement Company in the nearby unincorporated company town of Ilasco.

The Mark Twain Memorial Lighthouse was constructed in 1933 as a public works project under President Franklin D. Roosevelt. It has been lit on ceremonial occasions at three separate times by Presidents Roosevelt, John F. Kennedy, and Bill Clinton. Rockcliffe Mansion, a private house on a knoll in Hannibal, is listed on the National Register of Historic Places.

In 2011, the Mark Twain Boyhood Home and Museum released Mark Twain: Words & Music, a CD featuring entertainers who recount Mark Twain's life in spoken word and song. Several songs were written especially for the project and refer to Hannibal, including "Huck Finn Blues" by Brad Paisley and "Run Mississippi" by Rhonda Vincent. Other artists include Jimmy Buffett as Huckleberry Finn, Clint Eastwood as Twain, and Garrison Keillor as the narrator of the project.

Geography

Hannibal is next to the Mississippi River and is situated across the river from East Hannibal, Illinois.

Climate
Hannibal's climate is hot-summer humid continental (Dfa), with cold, snowy winters and hot, humid summers. Three months average below freezing, seven months average above 50°F, and three months average above 22°C.

Demographics

The Hannibal Micropolitan Statistical Area is composed of Marion and Ralls counties.

2010 census
At the 2010 census, there were 17,916 people, 7,117 households, and 4,400 families living in the city. The racial makeup of the city was 88.8% White, 7.1% African American, 0.2% Native American, 0.6% Asian, 0.1% Pacific Islander, 0.5% from other races, and 2.7% from two or more races. Hispanic or Latino of any race were 1.8%.

Of the 7,117 households, 31.3% had children under the age of 18 living with them, 43.2% were married couples living together, 14.5% had a female householder with no husband present, 4.2% had a male householder with no wife present, and 38.2% were non-families. 31.6% of households were one person and 13% were one person aged 65 or older. The average household size was 2.36 and the average family size was 2.96.

The age distribution was 23.5% of residents were under the age of 18, 11.2% between the ages of 18 and 24, 24.4% from 25 to 44, 26% from 45 to 64, and 14.9% 65 or older. The median age was 37.3 years. The gender makeup of the city was 47.5% male and 52.5% female.

2000 census
As of the census of 2000, there were 17,757 people, 7,017 households, and 4,554 families living in the city. The population density was 1,215.3 people per square mile (469.3/km). There were 7,886 housing units at an average density of 539.7/sq mi (208.4/km). The racial makeup of the city was 90.61% White, 6.57% African American, 0.35% Native American, 0.35% Asian, 0.07% Pacific Islander, 0.25% from other races, and 1.79% from two or more races. Hispanic or Latino of any race were 1.13% of the population. 25.9% were of American, 23.8% German, 10.9% Irish, and 10.0% English ancestry according to self-identification in Census 2000.

Of the 7,017 households 32.5% had children under the age of 18 living with them, 48.0% were married couples living together, 13.6% had a female householder with no husband present, and 35.1% were non-families. 30.6% of households were one person and 15.0% had someone living alone who was 65 years of age or older. The average household size was 2.40 and the average family size was 2.98.

The age distribution was 25.8% under the age of 18, 10.5% from 18 to 24, 26.3% from 25 to 44, 20.6% from 45 to 64, and 16.8% who were 65 years of age or older. The median age was 36 years. For every 100 females, there were 86.7 males. For every 100 females age 18 and over, there were 81.8 males.

The median household income was $29,892 and the median family income  was $37,264. Males had a median income of $30,677 versus $20,828 for females. The per capita income for the city was $16,902. About 11.3% of families and 14.1% of the population were below the poverty line, including 18.2% of those under age 18 and 10.8% of those age 65 or over.

Economy
A thriving artist community has developed here because of its central location between the East and West coasts, and affordable and stable real estate prices.

The Underwood Company built the General Mills plant here because its founder appreciated Mark Twain's writing and wanted to help his hometown. 

Major employers include the Hannibal Regional Hospital and Hannibal Clinic. Major manufacturers include BASF Chemical Corporation (formally American Cyanamid), General Mills, and Watlow Electric Manufacturing Company. The Swiss Colony maintains a data call center in Hannibal.

Because Hannibal is a Certified Local Government, residents, and business owners have access to federal and state tax credits, grants, and other funding sources.

Tourism is a major part of Hannibal's economy, in large part because Samuel Clemens lived there as a boy and immortalized the town under his pen name, Mark Twain. The Mark Twain Boyhood Home & Museum and Mark Twain Cave are two of the city's major attractions.

Government
Hannibal has a Home Rule Charter form of government. Public services include police, fire, parks and recreation, public works, streets, inspections, tourism, library, and airport. There is a municipal court, and the Marion County Courthouse is located in Hannibal. A second county courthouse is located in the county seat in Palmyra.

Education

Hannibal High School was founded in 1896. This public high school is part of the Hannibal School District #60, with K-12 grades serving Hannibal and surrounding areas. It is located at 4500 McMasters Ave. 63401.

Hannibal-LaGrange University is a four-year, Christian liberal arts university accredited by the Higher Learning Commission; it is a member of the North Central Association of Colleges and Schools. Founded in 1858 in LaGrange, Missouri, the campus moved downriver to Hannibal in 1928. Dr. Robert Matz was elected the 18th president of Hannibal-LaGrange University in 2022.

Moberly Area Community College (MACC-Hannibal Area Higher Education Center) is a two-year community college established in 1999. The MACC-Hannibal Campus is located on Shinn Lane near the hospital.

Hannibal has a lending library, the Hannibal Free Public Library.

Media
The city is served by the Hannibal Courier-Post newspaper, printed daily on Tuesday through Saturday. KHQA is a television station licensed to Hannibal and located in Quincy, Illinois. Radio stations licensed to Hannibal include KGRC 92.9 FM, KHBL 96.9 FM, KHMO 1070 AM, and KJIR 91.7 FM.

Transportation
Interstate 72 was extended into Hannibal in 2000 from Illinois across the Mark Twain Memorial Bridge.  Interstate 72 extends west to the intersection with U.S. Route 61. Future plans call for extending Interstate 72 west along U.S. Route 36 to Cameron, Missouri. This will give Hannibal an east-west link connecting Kansas City to Springfield. The Chicago–Kansas City Expressway links Hannibal from Kansas City to Chicago, Illinois. U.S. Route 61 goes from St. Louis in the south to St. Paul, Minnesota; it is known as the Avenue of the Saints corridor.

Hannibal Regional Airport (formerly Hannibal Municipal Airport) was renamed in 2003 as William P. Lear Field, in honor of Lear. He grew up in Hannibal and invented the Lear Jet.

Freight railroad tracks link Hannibal in all directions: Burlington Northern Santa Fe (BNSF) tracks lead north to West Quincy and Burlington, IA and south to St. Louis. Norfolk Southern (NS) tracks lead west to Kansas City and east to Springfield and Decatur.

Notable people
 Jake Beckley, major league baseball player
 James Carroll Beckwith, painter
 Blanche Bruce, politician during Reconstruction
 Marie Ruoff Byrum, the first woman to vote in the United States
 Robert Coontz, admiral
 Helen Cornelius, country music singer and songwriter
 Cliff Edwards, singer, actor, and the voice of Disney's Jiminy Cricket
 Cotton Fitzsimmons, basketball coach
 Lester Gaba, sculptor, writer, and retail display designer
 Clarence Earl Gideon, accused person responsible for landmark 1963 U.S. Supreme Court ruling of Gideon v. Wainwright
 Julia Greeley, born in slavery; today being considered for Saint in Roman Catholic Church
 Robert V. Hogg, statistician, educator, and co-author of the classic math-stat textbook
 Harry Richard Landis, one of the last surviving World War I veterans, born near Hannibal
 William P. Lear, inventor of the car radio and manufacturer of the Lear Jet
 Lydia Locke, opera singer 
 Warren H. Orr, Chief Justice of the Illinois Supreme Court
 Eddie Phillips, major league baseball pinch runner
 George Poage, the first African American to win an Olympic medal
 Ron Powers, author
 Benjamin Prentiss, Civil War officer
 Albert L. Rendlen, Chief Justice of the Supreme Court of Missouri
 William Hepburn Russell, Attorney and political figure who owned the Boston Rustlers of the National League in 
 Mary Rhodes Russell, Chief Justice of the Supreme Court of Missouri
 Scott Sanders, baseball player
 Melissa Scholes Young, author of Flood
 Larry Thompson, Deputy Attorney General of the United States under President George W. Bush
 Mark Twain (Samuel L. Clemens), author
 Tyler1, Twitch streamer

Attractions

Cameron Cave
Hannibal Rocks Offroad Park
Jim's Journey: The Huck Finn Freedom Center'John Garth's Woodside Mansion
Lover's Leap - Cliffside overlooking the Mississippi River and downtown Hannibal.  The name comes from the local legend of two Native American lovers who were forbidden by their respective tribes to marry each other.  Warriors were sent to kill the lovers, but the lovers, finding themselves cornered at the top of the cliff, embraced each other and threw themselves off the cliff to their deaths.
Mark Twain Boyhood Home & Museum Properties
Mark Twain Cave - The cave that inspired Twain's tale of a lost Tom & Becky.
Mark Twain Memorial Lighthouse - The only lighthouse built inland features a panoramic view of Hannibal and the Mississippi River. 244 steps to the top.
Mark Twain Riverboat
Molly Brown Birthplace & Museum - Home of RMS Titanic survivor.
Riverview Park -  of wooded land and scenic views of the Riverfront with over 3 miles of trails.
Rockcliffe Mansion - Around the start of the 20th-century mansion.
Sawyer's Creek Fun Park - Amusement complex on the riverfront.
Tom & Becky Appearances - Local children are chosen to portray the famous literary couple in local appearances and in downtown Hannibal every Saturday and Sunday from March to October.
Tom Sawyer Days - Fence painting contest, frog jumping contest, mud volleyball, local arts and crafts and Fourth of July fireworks display from Lover's Leap.

Gallery

References

Further reading
 Paul A. Shackel, "America’s home town: fiction, Mark Twain, and the re‐creation of Hannibal, Missouri." International Journal of Heritage Studies 17.3 (2011): 197-213. online
External links

 
 
 A visit to Mark Twain's Hannibal, Mo. - video and article by The LA Times''
 Historic maps of Hannibal in the Sanborn Maps of Missouri Collection at the University of Missouri

 
Cities in Marion County, Missouri
Cities in Ralls County, Missouri
Cities in Missouri
Missouri populated places on the Mississippi River
Hannibal, Missouri micropolitan area
Quincy–Hannibal area
Populated places established in 1819